Samantha Silver and Joey Manderino are an American producing and writing team. They are best known for their work together on the sitcom Austin & Ally.

Before they began writing together, Silver wrote the 2008 film Legacy and wrote an episode of Good Luck Charlie and Manderino has written for the web series The Morning After. Manderino is also one half of the comedy team Joey & David with David Young, who have produced a number of videos for CollegeHumor.com.

References

External links

American television producers
American women television producers
American television writers
Living people
Screenwriting duos
American women television writers
Place of birth missing (living people)
Year of birth missing (living people)
21st-century American women